Regional elections were held in some regions of Italy during 1968. These included:

Aosta Valley on 21 April
Friuli-Venezia Giulia on 26 May
Trentino-Alto Adige on 17 November

Elections in Italian regions
1968 elections in Italy